Altoona is a city in Blair County, Pennsylvania, United States. It is the principal city of the Altoona metropolitan statistical area (MSA). The population was 43,963 at the time of the 2020 census, making it the 18th most populous city in Pennsylvania. The Altoona MSA includes all of Blair County and was recorded as having a population of 122,822 at the 2020 Census, around 100,000 of whom live within a  radius of the Altoona city center according to U.S. Census ZIP Code population data. This includes the adjacent boroughs of Hollidaysburg and Duncansville, adjacent townships of Logan, Allegheny, Blair, Frankstown, Antis, and Tyrone, as well as nearby boroughs of Bellwood and Newry.

Having grown around the railroad industry, the city has worked to recover from industrial decline and urban decentralization experienced in recent decades. The city is home to the Altoona Curve baseball team of the Eastern League, which is the AA affiliate of the Pittsburgh Pirates Major League Baseball team. The Altoona Symphony Orchestra has called Altoona home since 1928. Prominent landmarks include the Horseshoe Curve, the Railroaders Memorial Museum, the Juniata Shops of the Altoona Works, the Mishler Theatre, the Cathedral of the Blessed Sacrament, and the Jaffa Shrine Center.

History

Prior to European settlement, the Altoona area was inhabited by the Iroquois Confederacy. Altoona was founded by the Pennsylvania Railroad (PRR) in 1849 as the site for a shop and maintenance complex. Altoona was incorporated as a borough on February 6, 1854, and as a city under legislation approved on April 3, 1867, and February 8, 1868.

Altoona
One explanation of the city's name is that the word Altoona is a derivative of the Latin word altus, meaning high.

That explanation is contradicted by Pennsylvania Place Names. Although Altoona, in Blair County, is popularly known as "the Mountain City", its name has no direct or indirect etymological relation to the Latin adjective altus, signifying "elevated, lofty." Two very different explanations of the origin of the name are current. The one which seems to be the most likely and reasonable runs as follows: "The locomotive engineer who ran the first train into Altoona in 1851 was Robert Steele, who died several years ago, aged nearly 90 years. He was then the oldest continuous resident of the city. He was much respected and had long been one of the private pensioners of Andrew Carnegie. Mr. Steele is authority for the statement that Col. Beverly Mayer, of Columbia, Pennsylvania, who, as a civil engineer of what was then the Pennsylvania Central Railway, had laid out the tracks in the yards of the newly projected city, named the place Altoona after the city of Altona in Danish Holstein, which became part of Germany in 1864.

The German Altona, which is today a district of Hamburg, lies on the right bank of the Elbe, immediately west of Hamburg city center, and is an important railway and manufacturing center with a population of nearly 200,000. The etymological derivation of the name Altona is not known with certainty. Linguistic research indicates that the name of German Altona is probably based on a former tributary of the Elbe river called Altenawe or Altenah (meaning old meadow), which is shown in the 1568 map of the Elbe river by Melchior Lorichs and in the 1652 maps by Johannes Mejer (published by Caspar Danckwarth).

In 1849, David Robinson sold his farm to Archibald Wright of Philadelphia, who transferred the property to his son, John A. Wright, who laid it out in building lots, became one of the founders of Altoona, and was responsible for the naming of the town. According to his own statement, he had spent considerable time in the Cherokee country of Georgia, where he had been especially attracted by the beautiful name of Allatoona, which he had bestowed upon the new town in the belief that it was a Cherokee word meaning "the high lands of great worth." In the Cherokee language there is a word eladuni, which means "high lands", or "where it is high"; but to a Cherokee, Allatoona and eladuni are so different that the former could hardly be derived from the latter.

An older history dated 1883 favored the Cherokee derivation, stating that "Its name is not derived from the Latin word altus nor from the French word alto, as has frequently been asserted and published, but from the beautiful, liquid, and expressive Cherokee word Allatoona. This is on the authority of the person who bestowed the name, Mr. Wright, of Philadelphia, who was long a resident of the Cherokee country in Georgia, and an admirer of the musical names of that Indian language."

For 60 days in 2011, the city officially changed its name to "POM Wonderful Presents: The Greatest Movie Ever Sold" in exchange for $25,000 as part of a marketing gimmick for the movie of the same name.

Growth

In late September 1862, Altoona was home to the War Governors' Conference which brought together 13 governors of Union states. This body gave early approval to the Emancipation Proclamation. The town grew rapidly in the late 19th century, its population approximately 2,000 in 1854, 10,000 in 1870, and 20,000 in 1880. The demand for locomotives during the Civil War stimulated much of this growth, and by the later years of the war, Altoona was known as a valuable city for the North. Altoona was also the site of the first Interstate Commission meeting to create and design the Gettysburg National Cemetery following the devastating Battle of Gettysburg. The centrality and convenience of the town's rail transportation brought these two important gatherings to the city during the war.

Horseshoe Curve
Horseshoe Curve, a curved section of track built by the PRR, has become a tourist attraction and National Historic Landmark.

The curve was built to help trains cross the Allegheny Ridge, a barrier to westward trade. Construction of the Erie Canal in New York 20 years earlier had diverted much port traffic from Philadelphia to New York City, feeding that city's commercial dominance. Because the curve was an industrial link to the western United States, Horseshoe Curve was a primary target of eight Nazi saboteurs who had landed during World War II from U-boats of Nazi Germany's Kriegsmarine during Operation Pastorius.

The PRR built 7,873 of its own locomotives at the Works, the last in 1946. PRR shaped the city, creating the city's fire departments and moving the hospital to a site nearer to the shop's gates. Today, the fire department employs 65 people and is the largest career department between Harrisburg and Pittsburgh. PRR sponsored a city band and constructed Cricket Field (a sports complex). In 1853, the PRR built the Mechanic's Library, the first industrial library in the nation which exists today as the Altoona Area Public Library. With the decline in railroad demand after World War II, things began to decline. Many treasures of the city's history disappeared, including the Logan House Hotel and railroad shops.

Horseshoe Curve remains a popular tourist attraction. There is a funicular that takes visitors to a viewing area, or it can be reached by climbing 194 steps.

Tornado
On May 22, 1949, at about 6 pm, a tornado moved through the southern part of Altoona. According to the Altoona Mirror, the tornado touched down near Sugar Run Road in the Canan Station area of Allegheny Township and cut a  swath of destruction through the southwestern portion of Altoona. Trees over a foot in diameter were "twisted apart" and several houses were unroofed, and garages were demolished in the Canan Station and Sugar Run areas. Along 58th Street large trees were uprooted, one of them leaving a seven-foot hole in the ground. Also on 58th Street, the roof was torn off a restaurant, as was its brand-new neon sign, and a large billboard was pushed to the ground. Houses lost shingles and there was extensive tree damage in the Eldorado and Llyswen sections of town. Huge trees were blown down in Highland Park. The Adams School, located near the end of the tornado's path at 6th Avenue and 24th street, had damage to its slate roof and several windows were blown out.

Houses were unroofed and barns were destroyed in the Henrietta and Millerstown area. A 17-year-old girl was injured in Henrietta.

A map made by Dr. Ted Fujita in 1974 of all of the tornadoes in the U.S. between 1930 and 1974 shows these two tornadoes mapped as F1 tornadoes on the Fujita Scale.

Current
Altoona is one of the dual seats of the Roman Catholic Diocese of Altoona–Johnstown. The Cathedral of the Blessed Sacrament was made a cathedral and rechristened from St. John's Church in 1851.

The Altoona Mirror newspaper, founded in 1876 by Harry Slep, is Altoona's oldest media outlet. Today, the newspaper has a daily circulation of 32,000 and a Sunday circulation of 39,000. Approximately 13,000 people read the online edition of the newspaper each day.

Altoona is home to the world's oldest wooden roller coaster, the Leap-The-Dips, located in Lakemont Park.

Geography
Altoona lies at the base of Brush Mountain within Logan Valley and Pleasant Valley. Altoona is situated in the Allegheny Mountains.

Climate
Under the Köppen climate classification, Altoona falls within either a hot-summer humid continental climate (Dfa) if the  isotherm is used or a humid subtropical climate (Cfa) if the  isotherm is used. Summers are hot and winters are moderately cold with wide variations in temperature. Total precipitation is greatest in September and least in February.

City neighborhoods

The main sections of Altoona are the Downtown, Center City, Logantown, Fairview, Juniata, Wehnwood, Calvert Hills, 5th Ward, Westmont, Eldorado, East End, Dutch Hill, Pleasant Valley, Hileman Heights, 6th Ward, Mansion Park, Llyswen, Garden Heights, and Highland Park. Some significant neighborhoods are Little Italy, Gospel Hill, Toy Town, Columbia Park, Knickerbockers, and Curtin. Some areas within Logan Township, outside the city limits but still considered sections of Altoona, are Lakemont, Greenwood, Bellmeade, Westfall, Newburg, and Red Hill. Many of the older districts consist of a mix of rowhomes and individual homes, which were a common building style in railroad towns so-as to provide for worker and manager housing, respectively.

Downtown
The downtown is the cultural and commercial center of Altoona and straddles the famous railroads. As is typical to a traditional city layout, the downtown is centrally located and contains significant development in all directions. Much of the area is listed on the National Register of Historic Places as the Downtown Altoona Historic District. Popular landmarks include the Mishler Theatre, the Penn Alto Building (formerly the Penn Alto Hotel), the Gable's Building, City Hall, the Cathedral of the Blessed Sacrament, and Eleventh Avenue itself.

Altoona has several notable churches, including the Cathedral of the Blessed Sacrament at the corner of 13th Street and 13th Avenue, the building on the corner of 12th Street and 14th Avenue that used to house the First Presbyterian Church, and the First Lutheran Church on the corner of 14th Street and 12th Avenue. The Station Medical Center, formerly known as the Station Mall, was a downtown mall built during the 1970s in place of many old railroad shops. The downtown contains most of what is known as Altoona's Little Italy district.

Because of the geography of the area, exact or natural boundaries for Downtown are not present. Therefore, Downtown is generally defined by what the city has zoned as Central Business: between 13th Avenue and the PRR Expressway, and from 7th Street to 16th Street. However, it is common for areas within Logantown and Center City to be expressed locally as "downtown".

The Texas Hot Dog was originally created in downtown Altoona in 1918, although the Paterson, New Jersey, Texas Hot Dog location, which opened in 1924, is more famous.

Architecture
The commercial core of the downtown includes many multistory residential, commercial, and mixed-use facilities designed at the turn of the 20th century in a mix of Victorian, Edwardian Baroque, and Neo-Romanesque styles. This style features high ceilings, resulting in taller buildings than is typical for the number of floors. The high ceilings are typically made of either tin or plaster, although sometimes a drop ceiling is utilized.

Individual homes originally provided housing to managers and executives of the PRR and have structural similarities to Victorian or Edwardian mansions, but built very narrow and tall. These are sometimes used as double or triple family apartments or even converted into commercial space. Outside of the commercial core is a mosaic of multistory commercial structures, mixed-use facilities, single story commercial structures, apartment buildings, multi-unit housing, and single-family homes.

The U.S. post office in Altoona contains two oil-on-canvas WPA-commissioned murals painted by Lorin Thompson in 1938, titled Pioneers of Altoona and Growth of the Road. Murals were produced from 1934 to 1943 in the United States through the Section of Painting and Sculpture, later called the Section of Fine Arts, of the Treasury Department.

Center City
Center City comprises industrial and commercial zones as well as urban and multiple household residential zones. Often, the Center City, Little Italy, and Gospel Hill areas (as well as Lower Fairview) are included as part of "downtown" for tourism and promotional purposes, much like how the Strip District in Pittsburgh is promoted. This is due to both the proximity and the fact that the buildings from these sections are similar to downtown buildings and blend in with the skyline. On the west side of the tracks, Center City extends around Downtown for two to three blocks, with heavy residential, industrial and commercial to the north, south, and west. The eastern side of the tracks, which according to the public maps is called "East Side", runs along the length of the tracks from 1st Street to 23rd Street and from the tracks to 6th Avenue west to east. However, Altoona Area High School is considered Center City despite standing on the Dutch Hill side of 6th Avenue. The East Side of Center City is home to the high school and junior high, the former Roosevelt Junior High School, the Railroaders Memorial Museum, Boyer Candies, and the Station Medical Center of UPMC Altoona, as well as many current and old railroad facilities.

Little Italy and Gospel Hill
The neighborhood area known as Little Italy is between 7th Street and 12th Street north to south and 9th Avenue to 6th Avenue west to east. Sometimes this is extended to include the Station Medical Center. Gospel Hill is the neighborhood in the area of 15th Street and 16th Avenue and adjacent to the park of the same name.

Logantown
Logantown, just north of Downtown, is considered a direct extension of that area. It borders Fairview along 16th Avenue, Willow Avenue and Cherry Avenue to the north, 13th Avenue and Chestnut Avenue to the south, and Juniata Gap Road to the east. This is where the UPMC Altoona hospital is located, the tallest building in Altoona at 14 floors. This is also where Cricket Field used to be located. Logantown is zoned as a mix of commercial and residential uses and contains some of the oldest houses built in Altoona that are still standing.

Fairview
Fairview is a mostly residential area north and west of Downtown and Logantown. It borders Calvert Hills to the south at 12th Street, Downtown and Logantown to the east along 16th Avenue and Willow Avenue and then along Cherry Avenue after 5th Street, and borders Juniata Gap Road to the north. Fairview is zoned as multiple household residential in the areas directly bordering Downtown, and transitions to single household residential after 21st Avenue, and eventually to suburban after 24th Avenue. Many houses in the part of downtown near Fairview and lower Fairview are the middle-density mansions originally owned by managers and executives of the PRR. The most striking example of this is the Penn Alto residential hotel on the corner of 13th Avenue and 12th Street, which has two single-unit houses next to it. Conversely, there are several multistory residential and commercial buildings on 17th Avenue. One of the sections of the downtown is called "Lower Fairview" due to its transitional nature. The houses on 12th Street between 14th and 15th avenues (with two commercial buildings included) are designed based on an architectural pattern used in Philadelphia's urban neighborhoods.

Dutch Hill
Dutch Hill district contains an abundance of historic neighborhoods and traditional "corner markets". This section gets its name from the abundance of Germans who moved into this area when the city was still expanding. Dutch Hill is the area that borders the City Center to the east and is zoned as multiple household residential. The boundaries are generally considered 4th Street to 17th Street north to south, and 6th Avenue to Walton Avenue from west to east. However, as the Altoona Area High School and Junior High are considered City Center, the border is around 4th Avenue (or 3rd Avenue if the entire school zone is included) when between 11th Street and 17th Street.

Juniata
Juniata is defined as north of Juniata Gap Road, east of East 25th Avenue and on the west side of the railroad line. The area is zoned as mostly residential limited, but also uniquely has a significant area of light and heavy industry as well as a central business area. This is because Juniata was once its own city, and was incorporated into Altoona in the late 19th century. Because of this, the section's street names had conflicting numbers with the rest of the city and had to be given a "North" prefix. The commercial area is sometimes nicknamed "downtown Juniata". The most important street in Juniata's L-shaped commercial district is North Fourth Avenue. The J.L. Noble School was added to the National Register of Historic Places in 1996. The original Thompson's Pharmacy was on 2nd Street in Juniata before moving a few blocks to a larger main store and branching out to become a small, local chain.

East End
The East End is defined as the area on the east side of the railroad line north of 4th Street. It is called the East End because it borders the north end of the tracks where trains would depart east towards Philadelphia. Because of this, most streets have an East prefix. The East End is mostly single household residential and suburban but has small areas of residential-commercial and neighborhood business along Kettle Street and Lloyd Street, as well as highway business along Pleasant Valley Boulevard.

Pleasant Valley
Pleasant Valley is the area that centers on Pleasant Valley Boulevard, a massive stretch of highway business that runs the entire length of Altoona. The Sheetz store, known locally as "Super Sheetz", is located here along 17th Street and was the first of its kind ever built. The area is defined as southeast of Walton Avenue and extends from 1st Street to 22nd Street, with Polk Avenue to the east. As well as the large highway business area, Pleasant Valley has an even amount of single household residential and suburban, along with some small stretches of residential commercial and urban.

Eldorado
Eldorado is the southern section of Altoona, south of Logan Boulevard and west of 6th Avenue as well as a small section south of 57th Street all the way to Rhode Island Avenue (Goods Lane) in the east. Eldorado is zoned as almost entirely suburban, with small areas of light industrial and neighborhood business. The Sheetz headquarters is located in this area. At one time, this section was also known as the "West End" because trains leaving the south end of town head west towards Pittsburgh. Some parts of Eldorado are actually outside of incorporated Altoona and located in Allegheny Township and Logan Township. The part of Eldorado in Logan Township is a census-designated place.

Toy Town
Toy Town is the neighborhood between 31st and 33rd Streets and centered on Race Street.

Lakemont
Lakemont is located southeast of Garden Heights between Frankstown Road and Logan Boulevard. While residing within Logan Township just outside the city limits and designated as the "Village of Lakemont", it is commonly regarded as a section of Altoona. Peoples Natural Gas Field, the home of the Altoona Curve, is in Lakemont. Also in Lakemont are Lakemont Park and Galactic Ice. Lakemont is zoned as single household residential, residential commercial and highway business.

Greenwood
Greenwood is the area north of the East End and begins around a block north of Grant Street. While mostly within Logan Township outside the city limits and designated as the "Village of Greenwood", it is commonly accepted as a section of Altoona, especially since a three- by four-block zone lies within the city limits. Greenwood is zoned almost entirely as suburban with a section of highway business along Route 220. Greenwood Road is a lone exception with a more urban residential zoning. Ward Trucking's headquarters is located in this section of Altoona.

Wehnwood
Wehnwood is the area west of 25th Ave between Wehnwood Road to the north and 1st Street to the south. This is part of where Penn State Altoona is located. Wehnwood is mostly zoned as suburban or single residential, with an area of neighborhood business along 25th Avenue and Juniata Gap Road. There is a fair amount of student housing surrounding the campus, and therefore a small pocket of urban residential next to it.

Mansion Park
Mansion Park is named for the Baker Mansion, one of its prominent houses. There are several streets surrounding the old plantation where mansions built in the early 20th century still stand. Mansion Park Stadium is also located here, which is the 10,000 seat stadium where the Altoona Area High School Mountain Lions play. The Mansion Park area is located east of 6th Avenue, with Logan Boulevard and Ward Avenue to the south, 27th Street to the north and a block past Union Avenue to the east.

Columbia Park

Columbia Park is the neighborhood adjacent to Tuckahoe Park between 6th Avenue and Union Avenue, with Crescent Road to the south. The area is single and suburban residential. The name comes from the former Columbia Park baseball field.

Highland Park
Highland Park is the area south of Logan Boulevard, east of 6th Avenue, north of 57th Street and west of Ruskin Drive. The name comes from the hill that the area is centered on, the only significant highland in southern Altoona. The actual Highland Park is located on top of the hill. Highland Park is zoned entirely suburban.

The Knickerbockers
The Knickerbockers are a unique collection of homes along 6th Avenue between Burgoon Road to the north and 41st Street to the south. The Knickerbocker Historic District was added to the National Register of Historic Places in 2002. This collection of extremely closely built together homes are a local landmark, and the Knickerbocker Tavern is one of the most popular bars in the area.

6th Ward
6th Ward is the area south of Dutch Hill, west of Pleasant Valley, east of Curtin Neighborhoods and north of Mansion Park. It is between 17th and 27th streets north to south, and 6th Avenue and Michelle Drive west to east. This area consists of multiple and single residential zoning. There are several streets in the 6th Ward where mansions from the early 20th century still stand.

Westmont
Westmont is the area on the east side of the tracks south of 21st Street and between the 5th Ward and the tracks to the west and the 9th Avenue tracks to the east. The area is zoned as multiple, single and suburban residential as well as residential commercial and light industrial. This is probably one of the more varied and diverse areas of the city architecturally.

Curtin
Curtin is the neighborhood where the Jaffa Mosque is located, as well as the Broad Avenue Historic District, which was added to the National Register of Historic Places in 2002.

Hileman Heights

Hileman Heights is a suburban area south of Pleasant Valley. The Heights are from South 25th Street to South 27th Street and are between Wren Avenue to the west and Robin Avenue to the east. There is also a small section of residential commercial zoning.

Llyswen
Llyswen is a small section west of Union Avenue, east of Ruskin Drive, south of Ward Avenue and north of Plank Road. This low-lying area is almost entirely suburban, with small areas of multiple residential, residential commercial, neighborhood business, and highway business. The Llyswen Historic District was added to the National Register of Historic Places in 2002.

Garden Heights
Garden Heights is the area east of Plank Road, northwest of Lakemont and south of Frankstown Road. Garden Heights is mostly single residential but is zoned highway business along Plank Road, residential commercial along parts of Frankstown Road and Logan Boulevard, and light industrial south of Logan Boulevard. This is the only section of the defined city limits that Interstate 99 actually passes through.

Calvert Hills
Calvert Hills is a small area between 12th Street and 16th Street north to south and 17th Avenue to the east. This is an area of multiple, single and suburban residential on the hills around the former Keith Junior High School, which is now an apartment complex.

5th Ward
The 5th Ward and Westfall is the area on the west side of the tracks south of Calvert Hills and north of the Curtin Neighborhoods. It borders a park to the west also called Westfall.

Newburg and Red Hill
The northwestern corner of 5th Ward is known as Newburg, with Red Hill being farther north up Route 36. The boundaries for the southern area are 20th Street to the north and 10th Avenue to the south. The 5th Ward is a mix of single and suburban residential.

Demographics

As of the 2010 census, the city was 93.8% White, 3.3% Black or African American, 0.1% Native American, 0.4% Asian, and 2.0% were two or more races. 1.3% of the population was of Hispanic or Latino ancestry. The 2000 Census reported the following predominate ancestry/ethnicities: German (35%), Irish (17%), Italian (12%), English (7%), Polish (4%), Black or African American (2%), Dutch (2%), Scotch-Irish (2%), French (2%), Scottish (1%), Pennsylvania German (1%), Welsh (1%), Swedish (1%), Slovak (1%).

As of the census of 2000, there were 49,523 people, 20,059 households, and 12,576 families residing in the city. The population density was 5,069.7 people per square mile (1,957.1/km). There were 21,681 housing units at an average density of 2,219.5 per square mile (856.8/km). The racial makeup of the city was 96.01% White, 2.49% African American, 0.10% Native American, 0.32% Asian, 0.02% Pacific Islander, 0.24% from other races, and 0.83% from two or more races. Hispanic or Latino of any race were 0.74% of the population.

There were 20,059 households, out of which 28.4% had children under the age of 18 living with them, 44.6% were married couples living together, 13.8% had a female householder with no husband present, and 37.3% were non-families. 31.6% of all households were made up of individuals, and 14.7% had someone living alone who was 65 years of age or older. The average household size was 2.37 and the average family size was 2.98.

In the city, the population was spread out, with 22.9% under the age of 18, 10.9% from 18 to 24, 27.3% from 25 to 44, 22.0% from 45 to 64, and 16.8% who were 65 years of age or older. The median age was 37 years. For every 100 females, there were 88.3 males. For every 100 females age 18 and over, there were 84.5 males.

The median income for a household in the city was $28,248, and the median income for a family was $36,758. Males had a median income of $28,851 versus $21,242 for females. The per capita income for the city was $15,213. About 12.9% of families and 17.7% of the population were below the poverty line, including 24.1% of those under age 18 and 9.0% of those age 65 or over.

Economy

Historically, the sole economic force driving the growth of Altoona into a City was the Pennsylvania Railroad. While the various local railroad shops still employ over a thousand people, they are no longer the driving economic engine of the area.

The top field of employment in Altoona and the metro area is healthcare. Facilities include: UPMC Altoona with its many local facilities that employ thousands, Healthsouth Rehabilitation Hospital and its several local facilities, James E. Van Zandt VA Medical Center, dozens of doctors offices, and over 20 nursing homes and assisted living facilities.

Altoona serves as the corporate home to Sheetz, a rapidly growing convenience store chain in the United States. It now has over 600 locations throughout Pennsylvania, Virginia, Maryland, West Virginia, Ohio and North Carolina.

Altoona also serves as the headquarters to the candy company Boyer. Famous for their “Mallo Cup,” the company was founded in 1936, 42 years after the founding of The Hershey Company.

Another massive employer is the retail and service industries. Altoona is the linchpin of the Tri-City Region. A new shopping center, Convention Center Commons, opened in 2015. The new shopping includes an AMC Movie Theater, and a Holiday Inn Express.

Areas of retail include:
 Downtown region.
 The 17th Street corridor including what remains of the Station Mall.
 Certain large zoned sections along Logan Boulevard and 6th Avenue.
 The Logan Valley Mall which is a major retail staple of the area.
 Approximately  stretch of Pleasant Valley Boulevard and Valley View Boulevard as they converge into Plank Road, consisting of numerous stores and shopping centers. This area plus Route 764 which runs through Altoona and the northern and southern suburbs is known as the "Green Banana".
 The Walmart and Target shopping centers.
 The Logan Town Centre which is the newest shopping center in the area and sits directly next to I-99.

Industry
As typical of many Rust Belt cities, the economic downturn of the railroad resulted in the closure of many of the downtown's landmark stores and industries; and the simultaneous rise in prominence of the automobile shifted commercial development to the suburbs. However, through recent revitalization efforts, Altoona's downtown maintains a significant level of economic vitality and hosts few office and residential vacancies. The downtown maintains a significant focus on pedestrian-oriented development, as evidenced by the presence of more pedestrian bridges and underpasses across the railroad tracks (connecting the two parts of downtown) than automobile crossings.

Penn State Altoona has bought several downtown buildings, including the former Playhouse Theater building, the six-story Penn Furniture building, and the former WRTA building. The University has turned them into the Devorris Downtown Center, the Aaron Building and the Kazmaier Family Building. Recently Sheetz has added another building to Penn State Altoona called The Sheetz Center for Entrepreneurial Excellence on the former site of a department store behind the Amtrak Station. The University provides a flow of resources into the downtown, aiding in revitalization efforts. As an example of the university's value to the downtown's economy, the installation of the Blue Lot near the Wolf Court Building has improved the economic attraction of downtown by offering up to three hours of free parking. A bike path connecting the Campus to Downtown Altoona has also been built.

Sports

In the early 20th century, the Pennsylvania Railroad constructed a large sports complex at the intersection of Chestnut Avenue and Seventh Street. It was named Cricket Field in an attempt to appeal to Cricket-loving British investors. Cricket did not catch on with the Altoona populace, so its close relative baseball became the choice for Cricket Field. Well known baseball players as Babe Ruth and Josh Gibson played at Cricket Field, and the stadium was also the venue for numerous other sporting events, musical competitions, marching units, and activities. A plaza that's home to; Wendy's, Rite Aid Pharmacy and the Pennsylvania State Parole & Probation, stands today on the site of Cricket Field.

Altoona was the site of a  board track called Altoona Speedway from 1923 to 1931. On June 15, 1929, just two weeks after winning the 1929 Indianapolis 500, Ray Keech was killed in an accident at the Altoona Speedway.

Mansion Park Stadium

Altoona Area School District's Mansion Park Stadium has long been recognized as one of the finest athletic complexes in Pennsylvania. The stadium, which has a seating capacity of 10,400, is a source of community pride and regularly serves as the site of a variety of events that benefit the economy of the Altoona-Blair County area.

In the summer of 2009, Sports Construction Group, LLC installed "Trophy Turf," which has a 48-ounce face weight and inlaid football and soccer lines.

Mansion Park's first artificial surface was installed in 1989. Omniturf provided a way to maximize the use of the facility throughout the year and at the same time, save taxpayer dollars through reduced maintenance costs. AstroTurf 12-2000 was installed in 1999. The eight-lane polyurethane running track was installed in 1989 and has been resurfaced several times.

For 22 consecutive seasons, the playing surface has received rave reviews from players and coaches as athletes have experienced controlled footing regardless of the weather conditions. Most importantly, there has been a significant decrease in serious injuries since the artificial turf was installed.

During a typical fall season, more than 60 events take place on the turf. Altoona High varsity and junior varsity teams, Altoona Area Junior High School ninth grade teams, and Bishop Guilfoyle High School all play home football games at Mansion Park. The stadium is also the site of AAHS boys and girls soccer matches and countless practice sessions. District and interdistrict football and soccer playoffs are held each year at Mansion Park, the home of the PIAA Football Championships from 1992 through 1997. The Pennsylvania Scholastic Football Coaches Association East-West High School All-Star Game was played at Mansion Park from 2001 to 2010.

Numerous high school and junior high school track meet, including the District 6 Class AA and AAA championships and the West Central Coaches Meet, are held at the stadium each spring. The track is also used extensively on a daily basis by hundreds of community residents who enjoy walking and jogging.

Mansion Park has also been the site of a 1992 Pittsburgh Steeler intrasquad scrimmage, the Pennsylvania State Athletic Conference men's and women's college soccer championships, University of Pittsburgh preseason football practices and the 1995 PIAA Soccer Championships.

Music events have also been well received. Appearances by The Beach Boys, Up With People, the United States Marine Drum and Bugle Corps, the Penn State Blue Band, the Ohio State Pride of the Buckeyes Band, the University of Notre Dame Band of the Fighting Irish, the University of Illinois Marching Illini and the Indiana University of Pennsylvania Marching Band have attracted huge crowds. Drum Corps International competitions were held in 1998 and again in 2000.

Altoona Area High School's Commencement is scheduled at the stadium each year. Mansion Park is also the home of the American Cancer Society's Relay For Life.

In early 2010, a new scoreboard featuring a video display board with an improved stadium sound system was erected thanks to the generosity of local sponsors.

Education
Altoona has an education system that contains three high schools, two parochial, one public. Bishop Guilfoyle High School is one of the private parochial schools having grades 9–12. Great Commission Schools is the second private parochial school having grades K–12. Altoona Area High School houses grades 10–12. Altoona High is much larger than Bishop Guilfoyle, graduating around 500 students annually, while Guilfoyle graduates around 70.

D.S. Keith Junior High and Theodore Roosevelt Junior High merged in 2008 to become the Altoona Area Junior High School. Roosevelt was torn down and the ground on which it stood was constructed into the new field for the new junior high. D. S. Keith was turned into residential apartments.

Altoona is the location of the Pennsylvania State University, Ivyside Park campus, also known as Penn State Altoona. This is the third largest of the Pennsylvania State University Commonwealth campuses. The college has approximately 3,903 students as of the 2014–15 school year.

Altoona also has several technical schools. The Greater Altoona Career and Technology Center (GACTC) is located on 16th Street next to the high school and offers a variety of technical classes for both Junior High and High School students throughout Blair County, as well as high school graduates seeking a technical degree. YTI Career Institute has a campus in Logan Hills on Fairway Drive. South Hills Business School has a campus located on 58th Street.

Media

Newspapers
 Altoona Mirror

Radio

Television
The Altoona television market is part of the regional Johnstown/Altoona/State College market.

Infrastructure

Transportation
Altoona is a major center on the Norfolk Southern Railway's (NS) Pittsburgh Line. In Altoona, helper engines are added to heavy trains to give them extra power up and over Horseshoe Curve west of town. The Juniata Heavy Repair Shop Complex, originally built by the PRR, is the primary repair and maintenance facility on NS. On an average day, 60 to 80 trains pass through Altoona. The historical importance to the railroad industry and the current high level of railroad activity has made Altoona a mecca for railfans for over 60 years, with the Railroaders Memorial Museum and the Horseshoe Curve being popular spots.

Amtrak's Pennsylvanian stops at Altoona station once daily in each direction.

Local bus service in the city is provided by AMTRAN. In 2007, AMTRAN customers suffered a major loss in service due to cuts in state funding. In May of that year, Governor Rendell visited Altoona to discuss plans intended to rectify this situation.

Roadway service primarily consists of Interstate 99, which provides access to the Pennsylvania Turnpike to the south and Interstate 80 to the north; and U.S. Route 22, which provides east–west service and direct access to Pittsburgh and Harrisburg. Local roadways in Altoona tend to be given numerical names, and Streets are aligned northwest–southeast and Avenues are aligned northeast–southwest.

The Altoona–Blair County Airport provides commercial air service for Altoona, offering daily flights to Philadelphia International Airport on Countor as part of the Essential Air Service.

Emergency services
Altoona and the Altoona Area are serviced by several companies for emergency services. Given that Altoona is entirely encompassed by Logan Township, and some small areas within the city are belonging to the Township, City and Township services often intermingle. Given the close proximity to Hollidaysburg and Duncansville Boroughs as well as Allegheny and Blair Townships, City, borough and township services will often assist or be called in place of each other.

Police
The Altoona Police Department (APD) services the City. APD is about 66 strong, and the precinct is located on 16th St downtown.

Logan Township Police Department services all areas of Logan Township. However, since the Township encompasses the City, in order to be centrally located the precinct is located in the City on 7th Ave. LTPD is 16 strong.

Fire

The Altoona Fire Department (AFD) supplies fire and Quick Response Service (QRS) to the City, as well as Haz-Mat response for Blair County. The Department is also a part of the IAFF, local 299.

There are also several Volunteer Companies located just outside the city limits on all sides.

EMS
AMED or the Altoona Mobile Emergency Department provides EMS services for both Altoona and Logan Township as well as many surrounding areas in Blair County including Bellwood, Tyrone, and Roaring Spring. AMED has several online and several offline ambulances on duty at the main station 430 on 7th Avenue and 10th Street as well as an additional online ambulance at 480 in Lakemont.

Notable people
 John Ake, 19th Century baseball player
 Harry J. Anslinger, first commissioner of the Federal Bureau of Narcotics
 Leonard Beerman, rabbi
 Michael Behe, professor of biochemistry, author, proponent of intelligent design
 Brad Benson, professional football player, New York Giants
 Troy Benson, professional football player, New York Jets
 Andrew Jackson Bettwy, mayor of Nogales, Arizona
 Janet Blair, actress, star of such films as I Love Trouble and My Sister Eileen
 Arthur Blake, actor and female impersonator
 Ron Blazier, baseball player, Philadelphia Phillies
 Rob Boston, author, advocate of church-state separation
 Paul Revere Braniff, aviation entrepreneur
 Samuel Canan, 34th governor of American Samoa
 Susan Candiotti, CNN reporter
 Sam Cohn, New York talent agent
 Ripper Collins, professional baseball player, member of the Gashouse Gang
 Charlie Crist, congressman and former governor of Florida
 Paul C. Donnelly, NASA manager
 John Ebersole, professional football player New York Jets
 Ed Flanagan NFL player for Detroit Lions and San Diego Chargers, four-time NFL Pro Bowl selection, coach and teacher
 Danny Fortson, professional basketball player, Seattle SuperSonics
 Frank Gansz, American football coach
 Aaron Gilbert, painter
 Kevin Givens, professional football player, San Francisco 49ers
 Hope Hibbard, zoology professor, marine biology researcher
 Hedda Hopper, gossip columnist and actress, buried in Rose Hill Cemetery in Altoona
 Tommy Irwin, baseball player
 Mike Iuzzolino, basketball player
 Edwin A. Jaggard, Minnesota Supreme Court justice
 Richard T. James, inventor of the Slinky
 Stan Jones, Pro Football Hall of Famer (inducted 1991)
 Robert Jubelirer, Pennsylvania politician
 Theodore H. Kattouf, ambassador to the United Arab Emirates and Syria
 Henry Kloss, engineer
 Robert E. Laws, Medal of Honor recipient, World War II
 Cindy Lovell, educator and writer
 James Loy, Deputy Secretary of the U.S. Department of Homeland Security
 Pat Malone, MLB pitcher, appeared in three World Series
 Barry McCauley, opera singer
 John J. McGuire, science-fiction writer
 Kelly M. Miller, American academic
 Johnny Moore, basketball player
 William Nesbit, first president of the Pennsylvania State Equal Rights League
 Jackie Paisley, IFBB professional bodybuilder
 John Pielmeier, playwright and screenwriter
 H. Beam Piper, novelist and author of "Fuzzy" & 'Paratime' novels
 Mike Reid, musician and songwriter; retired football player
 Darlie Routier, convicted murderer 
 Wade Schalles, all-time record holder for most pins and most wins in amateur wrestling
 Gertrude Woodcock Seibert (1864-1928), writer
 Bob Sheetz, founder of the Sheetz convenience store chain
 D. Brooks Smith, judge
 Harry E. Soyster, general
 John A. Stormer, American Protestant pastor and anti-Communist author
 Steve Taneyhill, football player, South Carolina
 Andrew Kevin Walker, screenwriter
 Doug West, NBA basketball player
 Paul Winter, saxophonist

Sister cities
Altoona is a sister city with:
  St. Pölten, Austria

See also
 War Governors' Conference
 Mishler Theatre
 Railroaders Memorial Museum
 Penn Alto Building
 Georgism
 Altoona-style pizza

References

External links

 
A Special History Study Pennsylvania Railroad Shops and Works Altoona, Pennsylvania

1849 establishments in Pennsylvania
 
Cities in Blair County, Pennsylvania
Cities in Pennsylvania
Populated places established in 1849
Railway towns in Pennsylvania